Chen Yu-hsuan (born 16 January 1993) is a Taiwanese long distance runner who specialises in the marathon. She competed in the women's marathon event at the 2016 Summer Olympics.

References

External links
 

1993 births
Living people
Taiwanese female long-distance runners
Taiwanese female marathon runners
Place of birth missing (living people)
Athletes (track and field) at the 2016 Summer Olympics
Olympic athletes of Taiwan